Jack Hyde is a footballer.

Jack Hyde may also refer to:

Jack Hyde (Fifty Shades)
Jack Hyde, fictional character in Candyman (2021 film)
Jack Hyde Park in Tacoma, Washington

See also
Jack Hides, Australian explorer
John Hyde (disambiguation)